Lower Bambara Chiefdom is a chiefdom in Kenema District of Sierra Leone. Its capital is Baima.

References 

Chiefdoms of Sierra Leone
Eastern Province, Sierra Leone